The Three Laws may refer to:

Science
 Kepler's laws of planetary motion, three scientific laws describing the motion of planets around the Sun
 Newton's laws of motion, three physical laws that, together, laid the foundation for classical mechanics
 The laws of thermodynamics, originally three physical laws describing thermodynamic systems, though a fourth one was later formulated and is now counted as the zeroth law of thermodynamics

Other
 Clarke's three laws, three adages from British science-fiction writer Arthur C. Clarke's extensive writings about the future
 Three Laws of Robotics, a set of rules devised by the science fiction author Isaac Asimov